Abu Ja'far al-Mansur ibn al-Faḍl al-Mustarshid bi'llah (1109 – 6 June 1138) usually known by his regnal name Al-Rashid bi'llah was the Abbasid caliph in Baghdad from 1135 to 1136. He succeeded his father al-Mustarshid in the year 1135. He ruled for just one year from 1135 up to his deposition on 17 August 1136. When the populace of Baghdad rose in revolt against him.

Biography 
Al-Rashid bi'llah was the son of caliph Al-Mustarshid and his mother was one of Al-Mustarshid's concubines was called Khushf. She was from Iraq, and was the mother of his son Mansur, the future Caliph Al-Rashid Billah. His full name was Mansur ibn al-Faḍl al-Mustarshid and his Kunya was Abu Jaʿfar. He was nominated as heir by his father al-Mustarshid. As a prince, he spend his life in magnificent city of Baghdad. His name was minted on coins of Baghdad also on Seljuq coins along with the Caliph. When his father was mysterious killed in 1135, he smoothly ascended to the throne.

Like his father, al-Mustarshid, al-Rashid made another failed attempt at independence (militarily) from Seljuk Turks. To avenge his father's death, he insulted the envoy of sultan Ghiyath ad-Din Mas'ud who came to demand a heavy largess, incited the mob to plunder his palace, and then, supported by Zengi, who was equally hostile to the sultan because of the murder of Dubais ibn Sadaqah, set up a rival sultan. Mas'ud hastened to the rebellious capital and laid siege to it. Baghdad, well defended by the river and its canals, resisted the attack; but in the end the caliph and Zengi, hopeless of success, escaped to Mosul. The sultan's power restored, a council was held, the caliph deposed, and his uncle al-Muqtafi was appointed as the new caliph.

Al-Rashid fled to Isfahan where he was assassinated by a team of four Nizari Ismailis (Assassins) in June 1138. This was celebrated in Alamut for a week.

Death 
Ar-Rashid was assassinated by a team of four Nizari Shia Ismailis (Assassins) in June 1138.

A Mausoleum was built on his last resting place known as Al-Rashid Mausoleum is a historical mausoleum in Isfahan city. It dates back to the Later Abbasid era of Seljuqs and is located on the northern bank of Zayanderud beside the Shahrestan bridge. This structure is the burial place of Al-Rashid  the 30th Abbasid Caliph, who left his palace and fled from Baghdad to Isfahan, when Mahmud captured Baghdad. Two years later, Al-Rashid was stabbed and killed by Hashshashins in 1138. The only decorative element of the mausoleum is a stucco Kufic inscription.

See also
 Ahmad ibn Nizam al-Mulk a Persian vizier of his father Al-Mustarshid.

References

This text is adapted from William Muir's 1924 book The Caliphate: Its Rise, Decline, and Fall, which is in the public domain.

1109 births
1138 deaths
12th-century Abbasid caliphs
Assassinated caliphs
12th-century murdered monarchs
Dethroned monarchs
People of the Nizari–Seljuk wars
Victims of the Order of Assassins
Sons of Abbasid caliphs
Burials in Isfahan